Tony Gallagher (born 2 November 1963) is a British newspaper editor. He has been editor of The Times since 2022.

He was editor of The Daily Telegraph and joint deputy editor of the Daily Mail, before being appointed editor of The Sun in 2015.

Career
Gallagher attended Finchley Catholic High School in north London, the University of Bristol, and then City, University of London. He began his career as a trainee journalist at the Southern Evening Echo in Southampton in 1985, and moved to the South West News Agency in Bristol in 1987. He joined Today in 1988, and became a reporter at the Daily Mail in 1990. 

He attracted attention for his Princess Diana-related exclusives. He later became news editor and finally assistant editor in 2006. He joined The Daily Telegraph in October 2006 as head of news and became deputy editor in September 2007.

As deputy editor, Gallagher took the lead on exclusives relating to the MPs' expenses scandal. In November 2009, he was promoted to editor.

Gallagher relinquished his post with immediate effect in January 2014 and went on leave, spending some time working at the London restaurant Moro. In April 2015 he became deputy editor of the Daily Mail and shared the role with John Steafel. Gallagher said: "My huge admiration for Paul Dacre is well known and I am greatly looking forward to joining his outstanding team."

Gallagher was appointed editor of The Sun on 2 September 2015.
He was appointed deputy editor of The Times effective 10 February 2020, as Victoria Newton succeeded him as The Suns editor.

In June 2022 he came under scrutiny for deleting a story unfavourable to Boris Johnson in The Times while acting for editor John Witherow while the latter was on holiday. Johnson and Gallagher had been seen jogging together in the past. Gallagher had been in temporary charge of The Times for most of the year, while Witherow had been on sick leave. On 28 September 2022 Gallagher was confirmed as the new editor of the newspaper, as Witherow stepped down.

Personal life
Gallagher is a fan of West Ham United F.C., a team he came to support because his father worked in London's East End. He is married with three children.

References

1963 births
Living people
Alumni of City, University of London
Alumni of the University of Bristol
British newspaper editors
British people of Irish descent
Daily Mail journalists
The Daily Telegraph people
The Sun (United Kingdom) editors